Konstantin Yakovlevich Sheberstov (14 March 1919 – 23 March 1953) was a MiG-15 pilot of the Soviet Union. He was a flying ace during the Korean war, with around 12 victories. His number of victories is disputed. In 1951, he allegedly made a false claim on one of Yevgeny Pepelyaev's victories and was exposed, disgracing himself. On 23 March 1953, he died in a mid-air collision over Oreshkovo airfield (located in Voroynsk village, Babyninsky District, Kaluga Oblast).

See also 
List of Korean War flying aces

References

Sources 

Russian aviators
Soviet Korean War flying aces
Soviet military personnel of the Korean War
1919 births
1953 deaths
Recipients of the Order of the Red Banner